Ribonuclease U2 (purine specific endoribonuclease, ribonuclease U3, RNase U3, RNase U2, purine-specific ribonuclease, purine-specific RNase, Pleospora RNase, Trichoderma koningi RNase III, ribonuclease (purine)) is an enzyme. This enzyme catalyses the following chemical reaction

 Two-stage endonucleolytic cleavage to nucleoside 3'-phosphates and 3'-phosphooligonucleotides ending in Ap or Gp with 2',3'-cyclic phosphate intermediates

References

External links 

EC 3.1.27